MS3 may refer to :
 Mighty Servant 3, a 27,000-ton semi-submersible heavy-lift ship
 Junior medical student, in the list of medical abbreviations: J
 Metal Slug 3, a video game
 MotorStorm: Apocalypse, the third main video game in the series
 MegaSquirt3, a type of MegaSquirt electronic fuel injection controller
 Media Studies 3 - The Filming coursework section of WJEC

MS-3 may refer to :
 Mississippi's 3rd congressional district
 a type of trams of Putilov plant

MS.3 may refer to :
 Escadrille MS.3, a French air force unit of Escadron de Chasse 01-002 "Cigognes"
 Morane-Saulnier MS.3, a French parasol wing one or two-seat aeroplane of the First World War

MS 3 may refer to :
 Mississippi Highway 3